Jutulhogget is a small canyon in Sel Municipality in Innlandet county, Norway. The canyon was dug out by large amounts of water at the end of the last ice age.

References

Sel
Canyons and gorges of Norway
Geology of Norway
Landforms of Innlandet